Artemis Hospital is a JCI and NABH accredited hospital in Gurgaon, India. 

The hospital  was founded in 2007 by the promoters of the Apollo Group, as a multi specialty hospital providing research and technology oriented medical procedures. It acquired the NABH accreditation in 2017 and was the first hospital in Gurgaon to be accredited by Joint Commission International (JCI) in 2013.

Campus and location
This is a 600-bed hospital. It has systematic units to provide complete care for the patients to recover from various illnesses. The hospital has been involved in rare medical procedures like cerebral palsy,
emergency cases and paediatric heart care.

References

Hospitals in Haryana
2007 establishments in Haryana
Hospitals established in 2007